Pasricha  may refer to:
21719 Pasricha (1999 RR115) which is a main-belt asteroid discovered on September 9, 1999, by the Lincoln Laboratory Near-Earth Asteroid Research Team at Socorro.

People with the surname Pasricha
Josephine Acosta Pasricha (born March 26, 1945) is a Filipino indologist who translated the "Ramacharitamanasa" of Tulasi Dasa, the Hindi translation of the Ramayana by Valmiki in Sanskrit, into the Filipino language.
Parvinder Singh Pasricha is an Indian police officer, who served as the 30th police commissioner of the Mumbai Police, and as the Director General of Police of Maharashtra state.
Dr. Satwant Pasricha is the head of Department of Clinical Psychology at NIMHANS, National Institute of Mental Health and Neurosciences at Bangalore. She also worked for a time at the University of Virginia School of Medicine in the USA. Pasricha investigates reincarnation and near-death experiences.